Éric Fréchon (born 16 November 1963) is a French chef, Meilleur Ouvrier de France and three stars at the Guide Michelin. He has been described as "chef royalty"  and received positive reviews as chef of the restaurant Épicure at the Hôtel Le Bristol in Paris. In 2015 he re-opened the hotel restaurant Céleste which is part of The Lanesborough

Restaurants 
 1995: La Verrière d'Éric Fréchon (next to the Buttes Chaumont) 19th arrondissement of Paris (closed)
 2010: Le Mini Palais (at the Grand Palais) 8th arrondissement of Paris
 2013: Le Lazare (Gare Saint Lazare) 8th arrondissement of Paris
 2015: The Lanesborough

Honours 
 1993: Meilleur Ouvrier de France
 2008: Chevalier (Knight) of the Legion of Honour named by French President Nicolas Sarkozy
 2009: Three stars at the Guide Michelin

See also 

 List of Michelin starred restaurants

References

External links 
 Official site of Éric Fréchon 
 Official site of the Hôtel Bristol 

1963 births
Living people
People from Corbie
French chefs